Full upon Her Burning Lips is the ninth studio album by American band Earth. It was released on May 24, 2019 through Sargent House.

In support of the album, the band announced a US tour from May 24, 2019 to June 29, 2019, with Helms Alee as a support act. The first single from the album, "Cats on the Briar" was released March 6, 2019.

Critical reception
Full upon Her Burning Lips was met with generally favorable reviews from critics. At Metacritic, which assigns a weighted average rating out of 100 to reviews from mainstream publications, this release received an average score of 79, based on 12 reviews

Accolades

Track listing

Charts

References

2019 albums
Earth (American band) albums
Sargent House albums